Gérard Dubois may refer to:

 Gérard Dubois (chef) (fl. from 1991), Swiss-born chef and businessman
 Gérard DuBois (born 1968), French illustrator